Rite is an ambient album by Julian Cope and Donald Ross Skinner, released in February 1993 on Cope's own Ma-Gog label. It is the first album in the Rite series and has been described as "a series of lengthy, mostly instrumental jamming freakouts influenced by both Krautrock and psychedelic funk." The album was available as mail-order only.

Track listing

Personnel 
 Julian Cope – piano, keyboards, synthesizer, cover photography
 Donald Ross Skinner – organ, electric piano, clavinet, drums, producer, recording engineer
 Rooster Cosby – guitar, bass 
 J.D. Hassinger – drums, drum machine, keyboards 
 The William Stukeley Quintet – string arrangements on "Amethysteria"
 Paul Corkett – recording engineer
 Rob Carter – art, design
Quinner – back cover photography
 Seb Shelton – executive producer

References

External links
Rite on Discogs.com

1992 albums
Julian Cope albums